Walter Meier (3 August 1927 – 25 March 2017) was a German athlete. He competed in the men's decathlon at the 1956 Summer Olympics and the 1960 Summer Olympics.

References

External links
 

1927 births
2017 deaths
People from Börde (district)
People from the Province of Saxony
German decathletes
East German decathletes
Athletes (track and field) at the 1956 Summer Olympics
Athletes (track and field) at the 1960 Summer Olympics
Olympic athletes of the United Team of Germany
Sportspeople from Saxony-Anhalt